Robert Young "R.Y." Eaton (1875–1956) was a Canadian businessman and a member of the prominent Eaton family. He was a nephew of Timothy Eaton, the founder of Eaton's department store.

Life and career
He was born in 1875 to John and Margaret (née Herbison) Eaton. He was related to the Eaton's department store founder, as they shared the same grandfather, John Eaton Sr (1784–1834).

He took over control of the department stores when his cousin Sir John Craig Eaton died of pneumonia in 1922. Sir John's children were too young to run the company, so he filled in until one of the children reached an appropriate age to take over.

He proved to be an extremely capable president, and he expanded the company tenfold. His cousin-in-law, Lady Eaton, the widow of Sir John, never liked him. Throughout her life, she always referred to her branch of the family as the "owner Eatons" and his branch as the "worker Eatons". Lady Eaton's son, John David Eaton, eventually took over the presidency of the company at the age of 33, and R.Y. Eaton retired from business life.

He had a resort home, Ireton, built in Port Credit, Ontario, and later in Georgian Bay. He also served as president of the Art Gallery of Ontario from 1924 to 1941.

Marriage and children
He married Hazel Ireland (1889–1965) and had 5 children. His son John Wallace Eaton (1912–1990) worked at Eaton's and ran the Montreal store.

His son Captain Erskine Robert Eaton (1915–1942) graduated from the Royal Military College of Canada in 1934. At the outbreak of World War II, he was a member of the staff at Eaton's Montreal store. He died in the Dieppe Raid on August 19, 1942, at 27 years of age. His name is listed on the Memorial Arch at the Royal Military College of Canada.

References

Robert Young Eaton
Canadian businesspeople in retailing
Canadian people of Ulster-Scottish descent
1956 deaths
1875 births